Thierry Liagre (15 June 1951 – 17 August 2021) was a French actor.

Biography

Thierry Liagre died on 17 August 2021 in Beauvais at the age of 70.

Filmography

Cinema
The Cabbage Soup (1981)
 (1982)
 (1982)
Banzaï (1983)
Until September (1984)
 (1986)
My Best Pals (1989)
My New Partner II (1990)
 (1991)
La Totale! (1991)
Les Visiteurs (1993)
Crimson Rivers II: Angels of the Apocalypse (2004)
Love Me No More (2008)
Paris 36 (2008)
 (2010)
War of the Buttons (2011)

Television
 (1983–1988)
 (1984)
 (1985)
 (1985–1994)
 (1988)
Navarro (1989–2006)
Maigret (1991–2005)
 (1992)
Julie Lescaut (1992–2012)
 (1993)
 (1993–1994)
 (1994–2012)
Jamais deux sans toi...t (1996)
 (1996)
Les vacances de l'amour (1996–2004)
 (1996–2007)
 (1997)
 (2000–2009)
 (2005–2007)
 (2006)
Les Mystères de l'amour (2017)

References

1951 births
2021 deaths
French male film actors
French male television actors
Male actors from Grenoble